No Peace Without Justice (NPWJ) or Non C'è  Pace Senza Giustizia (NPSG) is an Italian non-profit organization, founded in 1993 by Emma Bonino, an Italian politician, former Member of the European Parliament and current Member of the Italian Senate.  NPWJ is based in Rome and is a member of the Steering Committee of the NGO Coalition for the International Criminal Court (CICC) and a constituent association of the Nonviolent Transnational Radical Party, an NGO with General (category I) Consultative Status at the United Nations ECOSOC.
The main programs areas are on international criminal justice, female genital mutilation, MENA democracy, including the Iraq project.
Human rights are most at threat in situations of conflict, where even the international community often promotes short-term measures intended to stop the fighting, but which breed more conflict, perpetuate impunity and undermine the rule of law, unless they provide accountability for the crimes and redress for the victims. Justice, democracy and the rule of law are the pillars of sustainable peace by guaranteeing fundamental freedoms and human rights. NPWJ's original core activities since 1993 were designed to promote the establishment of a permanent International Criminal Court as part of a more effective international criminal justice system for the prevention, deterrence and prosecution of war crimes, crimes against humanity and genocide.

International Criminal Justice Program

NPWJ’s international criminal justice program still focuses both on international and national efforts to restore the rule of law and provide accountability and redress for the victims of crimes under international law, be they through the International Criminal Court, or through ad hoc Courts or Tribunals, national prosecutions or other accountability processes. The overall objective of the international criminal justice program is to ensure that whatever solution is adopted, it is shaped and implemented so that it can contribute to the restoration of the rule of law, it is responsive to the needs of stakeholders and it adheres to the strictest human rights standards. While NPWJ continues to work towards the universality of the Rome ICC Statute by promoting its ratification and effective implementing legislation, much of its focus is on ensuring that those crimes are properly addressed through national and international judicial processes or accountability mechanisms, with the ICC acting as a catalyst, as a guardian and as a last resort.

Female Genital Mutilation Program

The female genital mutilation program, begun in 2000, specifically addresses one of the most widespread and systematic violations of the human right to personal integrity, committed against millions of women and girls worldwide, and which goes unchallenged under the pretext of respecting local customs. The overall objective of the FGM program is to develop a political, legal and social environment that challenges attitudes and behaviours on FGM and promotes its abandonment, in the context of the promotion and protection of women's and girls' rights, including through promoting the ratification and implementation of the Maputo Protocol on the Rights of Women in Africa. The program builds the strategic capacity of women’s rights advocates and field practitioners working on FGM and promotes legal reform as an effective tool for behavioural change in order to turn the tide of social norms against FGM.

Middle East and North Africa Democracy Program

The Middle East and North Africa democracy program, begun in 2003, also addresses situations where fundamental and universal principles are often set aside in the name of political stability and presumed cultural incompatibility. The overall objective of the MENA Democracy program is to promote democratic values, liberal institutions and open government through the development of political mechanisms of consultation that recognise non-state actors, NGOs and civil society as a legitimate and necessary counterpart for dialogue with State institutions on issues of democratic reform. The program is carried out both at national and at regional levels, in cooperation with several governments, non-governmental and institutional partners, aiming to develop effective and durable consultation and dialogue mechanisms on democratic reform.

Iraq Project

Within the framework of the MENA Democracy program, the Iraq project, begun in 2006, contributes to the constitutional and institution-building process in Iraq by promoting negotiation between leaders from the entire political spectrum on the most politically sensitive issues, including in particular the attribution of responsibilities and powers at the various levels of State, Regions, Governorates, Towns and Municipalities.  By providing opportunities for open and informed debate, the Iraq project aims to help prevent or defuse negotiation deadlocks and identify durable solutions.

Methodology

Priorities for action for all programs are selected on the basis of the needs as determined on the ground, involving all stakeholders in the design and implementation of activities.  In advocacy activities, NPWJ raises awareness and fosters public debate through explicitly political campaigns and the implementation of key programs, such as international and regional meetings, often co-hosted and co-organised with Government of the country in which they are held, fostering partnerships between public institutions, non-governmental organisations and other actors in society, to attain stakeholders’ ownership both of the political drive and of the results.  NPWJ also undertakes wide-ranging technical assistance, through the secondment of legal experts to governments for the drafting of legislation and to assist in negotiations on international human rights instruments. Finally, NPWJ has acquired unique field experience in “conflict mapping” and wide-scale documentation of violations of international humanitarian law in areas affected by conflicts and in implementing outreach programs engaging local communities in conflict and post-conflict areas on issues of international criminal justice.

Funding

As reported during the corruption investigation 2023 following the Qatargate, it was reported that the organisation received almost 6 million Euro support by the European Commission.

References

External links
 No Peace Without Justice

Peace organisations based in Italy
Human rights organisations based in Italy